The 2023 World Athletics Championships, the nineteenth edition of the World Athletics Championships, are scheduled to be held from 19 August to 27 August 2023 in Budapest, Hungary.

The city of Budapest had previously stated an interest to host the 2007 World Championships, but withdrew and it was eventually held in Osaka.

Results

Men

Track

* Indicates the athletes only competed in the preliminary heats and received medals.

Field

Combined

Women

Track

* Indicates the athletes only competed in the preliminary heats and received medals.

Field

Combined

Mixed

Venue
The championships will be held in the National Athletics Centre in Budapest, which will be built, and have a capacity of 35,000.

Entry standards
World Athletics announced that athletes would qualify by their World Athletics Rankings position, wild card (reigning world champion or 2022 Diamond League winner) or by achieving the entry standard.

To qualify as a Wild Card you had to be one of the following things:
 Reigning World Outdoor Champion
 Winner of the 2022 Diamond League
 By finishing position at designated competitions (Area competitions)
 Leader (as at closing date of the qualification period):
 Hammer Throw 2022 World Athletics Continental Tour
 World Athletics Challenge - Race Walking aka World Race Walking Tour
 World Athletics Challenge - Combined Events aka World Combined Events Tour

Countries who had no male and/or no female athletes who had achieved the Entry Standard or considered as having achieved the entry standard (see above) or a qualified relay team, could enter one unqualified male athlete OR one unqualified female athlete in one event of the championships (except the road events and field events, combined events, 10,000 m and 3000 m steeplechase).

Target numbers 
At the end of the qualification period, the 2023 World Athletics Rankings will be published. They were used to invite additional athletes to the World Championships where the target number of athletes had not been achieved for that event through other methods of qualification.

The maximum of three athletes per country in individual events was not affected by this rule. Member federations retained the right to confirm or reject athlete selections through this method.

Where the highest ranked athletes were from a country that already had three entrants for the event, or where member federations had rejected an entrant, the next highest ranked athlete became eligible for entry via the world rankings.

Area Champions
The following regulations shall applied for Automatic Qualification to the 2023 World Athletics Championships (not applicable for relays and marathon).
1. The Area Champion (in each individual event to be contested at the World Championships) automatically qualifies for the World Championships, irrespective of whether his performance has reached the Entry Standard. This does not apply to 10,000 m, 3000 m Steeplechase, Combined Events, Field Events and Road Events where the entry of the athlete will be subject to the approval of the Technical Delegates
2. The Area Champion shall be the one who has achieved the title either in 2021, 2022, or 2023
3. The Member Federation of the Area Champion will have the ultimate authority to enter the athlete or not, based on its own domestic standard or qualification system
4. If the Member Federation of the Area Champion enters the athlete, he will be considered as having achieved the Entry Standard
5. If the Area Champion, for whatever reason, is not entered, his quota will not be delegated to the second placed athlete and the normal entry rules and conditions apply
6. For those Area Championships that do not have certain events, the Area Associations can organize alternate Area-specific event Championships with conditions conforming to Area Championships Regulations. World Athletics shall be notified of such alternative Championships at least one month in advance of the events being held

Media coverage
In the United States, television rights to the championships belong to NBC Sports.

Schedule

References

2023
World Championships
Scheduled sports events
2023
International athletics competitions hosted by Hungary
2023 in Hungarian sport
August 2023 sports events in Europe
Athletics in Hungary
2020s in Budapest